Amphecostephanus is a monotypic genus of praying mantises in the family Chroicopteridae. It s represented by a single species, Amphecostephanus rex, that is found in Angola and Malawi. It was first described in "On some African Mantidae and Phasmidae in the Collection of the Deutschen Entomologischen Museum" in Archiv für Naturgeschichte, Berlin in 1912.

See also
List of mantis genera and species

References

Mantodea of Africa
Insects of Angola
Insects of Malawi
Insects described in 1912
Mantodea genera
Monotypic insect genera
Hymenopodidae